Kindrick Legion Field is a baseball park located in Helena, Montana which serves as the home field of three American Legion teams: the Senators, Reps, and Independents. It was previously the home ballpark of the Helena Brewers Minor League Baseball team who left after the 2018 season. The stadium was built in 1932 and holds 2,100 people.

Formerly called Legion Park, and later Memorial Park Field, the name of the ballpark was changed in the mid-1970s to Kindrick Legion Field in honor of longtime American Legion supporter Ace Kindrick.

City officials are considering the best future use for the field after the departure of the Helena Brewers: continue with just American Legion ball or seek to add a team from the collegiate summer Expedition League.

References

External links
 

Baseball venues in Montana
Buildings and structures in Helena, Montana
Tourist attractions in Helena, Montana
1932 establishments in Montana
Sports venues completed in 1932